Regina Krajnow (born 9 June 1950) is a Polish diver. She competed in two events at the 1972 Summer Olympics.

References

1950 births
Living people
Polish female divers
Olympic divers of Poland
Divers at the 1972 Summer Olympics
People from Gryfice